The 2017 Toray Pan Pacific Open was a women's tennis tournament played on outdoor hard courts. It was the 34th edition of the Pan Pacific Open, and part of the Premier Series of the 2017 WTA Tour. It took place at the Ariake Coliseum in Tokyo, Japan, on 18–24 September 2017.

Points and prize money

Point distribution

Prize money

Singles main-draw entrants

Seeds

 Rankings are as of September 11, 2017

Other entrants
The following players received wild cards into the main singles draw:
  Risa Ozaki 
  Kurumi Nara

The following players received entry from the singles qualifying draw:
  Madison Brengle 
  Jana Čepelová 
  Magda Linette
  Hsieh Su-wei

The following player received entry as a lucky loser:
  Aliaksandra Sasnovich

Withdrawals
Before the tournament
  Lauren Davis → replaced by  Wang Qiang
  Madison Keys → replaced by  Yulia Putintseva
  Ana Konjuh → replaced by  Naomi Osaka
  Petra Kvitová → replaced by  Kateřina Siniaková
  Mirjana Lučić-Baroni → replaced by  Catherine Bellis
  Agnieszka Radwańska → replaced by  Aliaksandra Sasnovich
  Anastasija Sevastova → replaced by  Daria Kasatkina

Doubles main-draw entrants

Seeds

 Rankings are as of September 11, 2017

Other entrants 
The following pair received a wildcard into the doubles main draw:
  Mari Osaka /  Naomi Osaka

Champions

Singles

  Caroline Wozniacki def.  Anastasia Pavlyuchenkova, 6–0, 7–5

Doubles

  Andreja Klepač /  María José Martínez Sánchez def.  Daria Gavrilova /  Daria Kasatkina, 6–3, 6–2

References

External links